Cookies: Bite-Size Life Lessons is a 2006 picture book by Amy Krouse Rosenthal intended to communicate life skills. Jane Dyer, who had previously illustrated Mem Fox's Time for Bed, illustrated Cookies with watercolor paintings of scenes such as picnics and old-fashioned kitchens. The book uses situations relating to cookies as a pretext for defining a variety of traits. Cookies is appropriate for children ages 4 to 8. The book made The New York Times Best Seller list. In The Winners! Handbook: A Closer Look at Judy Freeman's Top-rated Children's Books of 2006, Freeman describes Cookies as "old-fashioned sweet, without being cloying or didactic". In 2008, Rosenthal and Dyer released a sequel called Christmas Cookies: Bite-Size Holiday Lessons.

References

Bibliography

2006 children's books
American picture books
Children's fiction books
HarperCollins books
Books about cats
Books about dogs
Cookies in popular culture